is a 2011 Japanese tokusatsu television series.

Cast
 Tomohisa Yuge
 Rina Kirishima
 Reina Fujie

External links
 Official website 

2011 Japanese television series debuts
Tokusatsu television series
2011 Japanese television series endings